The Islamic Emirate of Rafah was a short-lived unrecognized Islamic state located in Rafah. It was founded by Jund Ansar Allah when they declared independence in 2009, two years after the Hamas takeover of Gaza.

Declaration 
On Friday, 14 August 2009, the leader of Jund Ansar Allah, Abdel Latif Moussa, unexpectedly declared the creation of an Islamic emirate in the Gaza Strip before 100 of his armed followers at the Ibn Taymiyyah mosque in Rafah after the Friday prayer sermon. During his sermon, Moussa condemned Hamas for failing to implement Sharia law and "not being any different from a Secular government."

Collapse 
Regarding the sermon as a challenge to their governance of the Gaza Strip, Hamas forces surrounded the mosque and demanded those inside to surrender. Exchanges of gunfire erupted into a seven-hour battle in which Hamas fighters sealed off the entire neighbourhood and fired rocket-propelled grenades at the mosque. During the firefight, 24 Palestinians were killed and more than 130 injured. The dead included twelve Jund Ansar Allah members, six Hamas members and six civilians, including three young children aged 8, 10 and 13. An Egyptian National Security Agency official said a three-year-old boy from Egypt, across the Egypt–Gaza border, was critically wounded by a bullet which reached him from the fighting in Gaza. A Hamas fighter later went to Moussa's house to arrest him, and Moussa killed himself and the Hamas fighter by detonating his suicide belt after being cornered. His house was dynamited by Hamas forces. Abu-Jibril Shimali, head of Hamas' Izz ad-Din al-Qassam Brigades in the southern Gaza Strip, died in the fighting. Israel believes that Shimali orchestrated the abduction of Israeli soldier Gilad Shalit in a June 2006 cross-border raid. Hamas did not permit media coverage of the event, barring journalists from entering Rafah or interviewing the wounded.

Aftermath 
Following the clashes, a number of Al-Qaeda-affiliated groups condemned Hamas as an apostate movement that committed "massacre" and charged Hamas's actions to "serve the interest of the Israeli settlers of Palestine and the Christians who are persecuting Muslims in Afghanistan, Chechnya, Iraq, and Somalia".

Websites associated with Fatah later released cellphone footage of what appeared to be Hamas executing Jund Ansar Allah fighters during the clash. The video showed Hamas militants gathering several Jund Ansar Allah fighters in the courtyard of the Mosque, and then mowing them down in a fierce burst of gunfire. Some of the Jund Ansar Allah men were shown lying motionless and bleeding on the ground. In two scenes, Hamas militants appeared to be shooting captives execution-style at close range, and bodies were seen falling to the ground. In another scene, a group of Jund Ansar Allah captives were seen standing motionless against a wall a few meters away. Israeli Channel 10 also broadcast a recording of what it said was the Hamas military communication channel, ordering Hamas forces to execute everyone. There was no immediate comment from Hamas officials. However, Hamas had previously denied that an execution took place at the site, or that members of Jund Ansar Allah were "massacred."

Reactions 
Following the battle, Jund Ansar Allah vowed to attack Hamas compounds and pro-Hamas mosques in revenge. On 29 August, bombs exploded inside a security compound and near a Hamas-affiliated mosque in Gaza City, according to security officials. Nobody was injured in the attacks. Jund Ansar al-Jihad wal Sunna, a previously unknown group, claimed responsibility for the attack, declaring: "We urge our jihadist brothers to join forces to conduct painful joint warfare against those miscreant murtadeen [Hamas] and end their reign." Associated Press said that "the two explosions appear[ed] to be revenge attacks against Gaza's Hamas rulers," and suggested a link with Jund Ansar Allah.

See also 

 Islamic Emirate of Kunar
 Islamic Emirate of Byara
 Islamic Emirate of Afghanistan

References 

2000s in the Gaza Strip
Former countries in Asia
Former emirates
Former theocracies
Former unrecognized countries
Rebellions in Asia
Emirates
States and territories established in 2009
States and territories disestablished in 2009
2009 establishments in Asia
2009 disestablishments in Asia
Lists of former countries
Former countries in Western Asia
Gaza Strip